Frog City is a ghost town and unincorporated community in Miami-Dade County, Florida, United States.

History
During the latter 20th century, Frog City was a small community made up of only a handful of residents. During this period, Frog City was most notable for its sausage trees and a small restaurant that specialized in frog legs, hence the community's name. However, the original community and restaurant has since been abandoned, and among the only things left is the old Frog City sign.

Geography

References

Unincorporated communities in Miami-Dade County, Florida
Unincorporated communities in Florida